is a private women's junior college in Naka, Ibaraki, Japan, established in 1967. The predecessor of the school was founded in 1907.

External links
 Official website 

Educational institutions established in 1967
Private universities and colleges in Japan
Universities and colleges in Ibaraki Prefecture
Japanese junior colleges
Women's universities and colleges in Japan
Naka, Ibaraki